Demonstrate is the third extended play by South Korean girl group, Rania, released by DR Music and distributed by Danal Entertainment. The EP was the last release to feature Di, Xia, and T-ae, who were the last-remaining members of the original line-up, as well as the final release to feature the RaNia name.

While marking the debut of Seulji and Hyeme, the EP also was the first to feature Alexandra Reid as a member, making Demonstrate the first Korean music release to feature an African-American singer debuting in a Korean group. The EP was released on November 5, 2015, and met with controversy due to the album being marked as "Rania Five," and Alex not being included in the MV. Lead track, "Demonstrate," peaked at number 25 on the GAON Social Chart.

Release and reception
Rania released Demonstrate on November 5, and had their comeback showcase on November 11 in Gangnam-gu, Seoul. The release of Demonstrate gained attention from the Korean media due to the debut of Alex as well as the release being the group's first in over 2 years. The music video for Demonstrate was met with controversy due to Alex being physically absent, as well as the group being referred to as "Rania Five," despite the group having six members. However, DR released a statement, claiming that Alex was absent from promotional material as a result of visa issues.

The single "Demonstrate," peaked at #25 on the GAON Social Chart. Despite this being Seulji's debut, she is not featured on any of the tracks. Xia sings Seulji's parts in the studio versions of "Demonstrate" and "Get Out". Former members Jooyi and Saem sing on "Hello" and "Up".

Track listing

References

2015 EPs
EPs by South Korean artists
Korean-language EPs
K-pop EPs
Rania (band) albums